Accha district is one of nine districts of the province Paruro in Peru.

Geography 
Other mountains are listed below:

Ethnic groups 
The people in the district are mainly indigenous citizens of Quechua descent. Quechua is the language which the majority of the population (90.20%) learnt to speak in childhood, 9.41% of the residents started speaking using the Spanish language (2007 Peru Census).

References